Pruszcz may refer to the following places:
Pruszcz, Świecie County in Kuyavian-Pomeranian Voivodeship (north-central Poland)
Pruszcz, Tuchola County in Kuyavian-Pomeranian Voivodeship (north-central Poland)
Pruszcz Gdański in Pomeranian Voivodeship (north Poland)
Pruszcz, Drawsko County in West Pomeranian Voivodeship (north-west Poland)
Pruszcz, Gryfice County in West Pomeranian Voivodeship (north-west Poland)